Vladimir branch of the Russian Presidential Academy of National Economy and Public Administration or  Vladimir branch of the RANEPA (Russian: Владимирский филиал Российской академии народного хозяйства и государственной службы при Президенте Российской Федерации), is one out of 64 branches of the  federal state-funded institution of higher professional learning - the  Russian Presidential Academy of National Economy and Public Administration.

History
The history of Vladimir branch of the Russian Academy of National Economy and Public Administration under the President of the Russian Federation goes back to Vladimir branch of the Russian Academy of Public Administration (RAPA). The Russian Academy of Public Administration (RAPA) was set up in 1991. Vladimir branch of the Russian Academy of Public Administration (RAPA) was founded by order of the President of the Russian Academy of Public Administration (RAPA) on June, 9 in 1995. 
The RANEPA was founded as a result of merger of the Academy of National Economy (ANE) which was established in 1977, the Russian Academy of Public Administration (RAPA), and 12 federal state educational institutions.
The RANEPA was founded by presidential order on September 20, 2010.
With the foundation of the RANEPA in 2010 Vladimir branch of the RAPA became Vladimir branch of the Russian Academy of National Economy and Public Administration under the President of the Russian Federation.

Academic programs
Vladimir branch of the Presidential Academy offers bachelor’s, specialist’s, master’s and PhD programs. 
Vladimir branch of the RANEPA trains managers, human resources managers, specialists in state and municipal administration, economists, lawyers as well as specialists in economic security and national safety. 
Vladimir branch of the RANEPA has got a full-time department, a part-time department and an evening department. 
Entrants apply to the academy after they finished a school, graduated from a college or a university.

Curriculum
The Academy curriculum is both theory- and practice-oriented. It combines lectures, seminars and tutorials. The curriculum consists of three major groups of courses.
The first group of subjects are the humanities, social and economic sciences. They are Philosophy, History, Sociology, Psychology, Study of Culture, Law, а foreign language, Political Science, Economic Theory, etc.
The second group of subjects are mathematical and natural sciences. They are Mathematical Analysis, Algebra, Probability Theory, Statistics, Concepts of Modern Natural Science, Information Technologies, etc. 
The third group of courses are professionally oriented subjects: Microeconomics, Macroeconomics, Business Accounting, Marketing for future economists, Management, Law of Employment, Financial Management, Business Planning, Strategic Management for management students, Theory of State and Law, Civil Law, Criminal Law, Civil Procedure, Criminal Procedure, Financial Law, Tax Law for law students, etc.
Within each group of subjects students are offered different optional classes.

Academic year
The academic program takes four or five years to complete for full-time students and from three to six years for part-time students. The typical academic year runs from September 1 till June 30. Generally full-time students have 3 – 4 classes a day. At home students do homework. In the third and fourth years full-time students spend considerable time on research and writing a diploma.

Exams 
Examinations are held at the end of each term. Final examinations are taken at the end of the course of studies. Professional capacity of students is tested by the Examination Board, which is composed of several members of the teaching and administrative staff.

Extracurricular activities
Extracurricular activities play a vital role at Vladimir branch of the Russian Presidential Academy of National Economy and Public Administration. 
Vladimir branch of the Russian Presidential Academy provides students with many opportunities to do sports. Students play basketball and volleyball in the gym, participate in regional table tennis, chess, track and field competitions.

References
 History
 Kremlin.ru
 RANEPA official website

External links
 Official website
 Academy at Edu.ru

Business schools in Russia
Universities in Russia
Educational institutions established in 2010
2010 establishments in Russia